Sky News at Seven was a weekend news programme on Sky News and Sky News HD in the United Kingdom. It ran from 7pm to 7.30pm on Saturday and Sunday. It was usually presented by Mark Longhurst. The programme was followed by Sportsline from 7:30 to 8:00pm.

Until late 2008, Sky News at Seven was part of the weekday schedule, presented by Anna Botting, but was dropped in favour of SkyNews.com, which has also been axed as of 2010. Sky News Tonight currently holds the slot.

Presenters

Sky News
Sky UK original programming
Sky television news shows